Operation Mammut (Germanised form of Mahmud, named after Mahmud Barzanji), was a German special forces mission in 1943 by the Wehrmacht, during World War II, for a team of two German Army officers, led by Major Gottfried Müller and accompanied by a Kurdish activist Ramzi Nafi Agha, to start a rebellion of the Iraqi Kurds in an attempt to expel the British from the region, gain control of the oil fields, and in some way deliver them to the Wehrmacht because Operation Barbarossa was not progressing as it was expected in reaching the Caucasus. In return for ejecting the British, the Kurds would be assisted in creating an independent Kurdistan.

The mission failed. Ramzi and the Germans operatives were taken prisoners by British and Iraqi forces, tortured and given the death sentence. Gottfried Müller managed to escape and return to Germany where he lived until his death on 26 September 2009. Ramzi had his sentence reduced to life imprisonment, however he became mentally disturbed in prison and consequently he was released from prison in 1947. Ramzi died two years later in 1949 in his hometown Erbil in Iraqi Kurdistan.

Sources
 Müller, Gottfried Johannes, In the Burning Orient, 3rd ed., Salem-Buchdienst GmbH, Stadtsteinach, 2007

Mammoth